Egberton Rulove "Roelly" Etienne-Winklaar (born June 22, 1977) is a Curaçaoan/  Dutch IFBB professional bodybuilder. Winklaar is generally considered to be one of the greatest bodybuilders of the modern era, displaying a rare combination of massive size and excellent conditioning.

Athlete Statistics
Height: 
Off Season Weight: 
Competition Weight: 
Upper Arm Size:  
Thigh Size:  
Waist Size: 
Calf Size:  
Neck Size:

Early life  and career
Roelly was born in Curaçao. His father died in a motorcycle accident when he was four years old. His mother moved the family to Rotterdam in the Netherlands when he was five years old. Although he enjoyed bodybuilding from a young age, he only became serious about the sport after a near-fatal car crash brought his life into focus. He then set his goals to becoming a pro, which he achieved by earning his pro card in 2009, then followed up by winning in New York City, in 2010. 

He spent much of his early career, under the watchful eye of Sibil “Grandma” Peeters, which afforded him an advanced education on proper exercise technique to get the most out of every movement.  He lived for a few years in Almere, before briefly moving to the USA as a professional.

Professional career
After earning his pro card, Roelly returned for the 2010 IFBB Arnold Classic and turned plenty of heads with an immense physique that earned him a strong seventh-place finish in a deep field in his IFBB debut. After placing third at the 2010 IFBB Australia Pro Grand Prix, Roelly shocked critics by winning the 2010 IFBB New York Pro. Seemingly out of nowhere, a new star had arrived.

Following this massive accomplishment, Winklaar experienced a boost in motivation and became a force to be reckoned with, earning his first Mr Olympia qualification. This was impressive, considering he beat out more established veterans like [Hidetada Yamagishi and Dennis Wolf. Since the 2010s, Winklaar has become one of the leading bodybuilding pros, once finishing within the top 5 of the Mr. Olympia finals (3rd).

Physique

Winklaar is noted for his large and impressive physique, displaying an impressive combination of massive size and conditioning, often out sizing taller competitors. In part due to his years spent as a gymnast in his youth, and his gifted genetics, Winklaar is considered to have the best arms in bodybuilding history, measuring at 24 inches. Winklaar has stated that other than intensity he has not had to do anything special for his arms. As long as he trained them hard, they kept growing and growing. These attributes, along with his engaging posing and personality has made him a fan favorite among bodybuilding fans.

Other media
Roelly Winklaar was prominently featured as one of lead figures featured in the 2013 documentary, Generation Iron, which highlights his preparation and training for the 2012 Mr. Olympia. Winklaar's appearance in particular, earned critical acclaim, documenting tensions with his then-trainer Sibil 'Grandma' Peeters and their declining relationship as his star rose.

Personal life
Winklaar has three children and resides in Amsterdam in the off season. He does his contest prep at Oxygen Gym in Kuwait City. His younger brother Quincy is also an IFBB Pro League bodybuilder.

Competitive history
2021   IFBB    Romania Pro - 9th
2021   IFBB    EVLs Prague Pro - 5th
2021   IFBB    Yamamoto Pro - 2nd
2021   IFBB    Mr. Olympia - 11th
2021   IFBB    Europa Pro - 2nd
2021   IFBB    Chicago Pro - 5th
2019   IFBB    Yamamoto Pro - 1st
2019   IFBB    Mr. Olympia - 5th
2019   IFBB    Arnold Classic Australia - 3rd
2019   IFBB    Arnold Classic Ohio - 5th
2018   IFBB    EVLs Prague Pro - 1st
2018   IFBB    Mr. Olympia - 3rd
2018   IFBB    Arnold Classic Australia  - 1st
2018   IFBB    Arnold Classic Ohio - 4th
2017   IFBB    EVLs Prague Pro - 1st
2017   IFBB    Mr. Olympia - 6th 
2017   IFBB    Arnold Classic Europe - 4th
2016   IFBB    Mr. Olympia - 6th
2015   IFBB    Arnold Sports Festival - 6th
2015   IFBB    Arnold Classic Australia - 6th
2015   IFBB    Mr. Olympia - 7th
2015   IFBB    Arnold Classic Europe - 5th
2015   IFBB    EVLs Prague Pro - 6th
2015   IFBB    Nordic Pro - 2nd
2014   IFBB    Wings of Strength Chicago Pro - 1st
2014   IFBB    Mr. Olympia - 12th
2014   IFBB    Arnold Classic Europe - 5th
2014   IFBB    Dubai Pro - 3rd
2014   IFBB    EVLs Prague Pro - 4th
2014   IFBB    San Marino Pro - 4th
2014   IFBB    Nordic Pro - 1st  
2013 	IFBB 	Chicago Pro - 1st
2013 	IFBB 	Mr. Olympia - 7th
2013 	IFBB 	Arnold Classic Europe - 6th
2012 	IFBB 	Mr. Olympia - 12th
2012 	IFBB 	Sheru Classic Asian Grand Prix Pro - 4th
2012 	IFBB 	British Grand Prix - 6th
2012 	IFBB 	Prague Pro Championship - 8th
2012 	IFBB 	Tampa Bay Pro - 4th
2012 	IFBB 	Arnold Classic Europe - 3rd
2012 	IFBB 	Europa Super Show - 4th
2011 	IFBB 	Arnold Classic - 8th
2011 	IFBB 	British Grand Prix - 2nd
2011 	IFBB 	Mr. Europe Grand Prix - 2nd
2011 	IFBB 	FIBO Power Pro Germany - 3rd
2011 	IFBB 	New York Pro - 9th
2010 	IFBB 	Arnold Classic - 7th
2010 	IFBB 	Australian Pro Grand Prix - 3rd
2010 	IFBB 	Mr. Olympia - 14th
2010 	IFBB 	New York Pro - 1st
2009 	NPC 	Arnold Amateur - 1st

See also
List of male professional bodybuilders
Mr. Olympia
Arnold Classic
Brandon Curry
Dexter Jackson
Cedric McMillan

References

1977 births
living people
Curaçao bodybuilders
Dutch bodybuilders
Professional bodybuilders